The Academia Cubana de la Lengua (Spanish for Cuban Academy of Language) is an association of academics and experts on the use of the Spanish language in Cuba. It was founded in Havana, on May 19, 1926. It is a member of the Association of Spanish Language Academies.

Spanish language academies
Cuban literature
Organizations established in 1926
Cuba–Spain relations
1926 establishments in Cuba